Ren Yongshun (born 8 April 1985) is a Chinese football defender.

Club career

Shandong Luneng

Ren Yongshun was the product of the Shandong Luneng youth system where he eventually graduated to the senior squad during the 2003 league season. He represented Shandong Luneng in the league for the first time as a starter on July 24, 2005 in a league match with Shanghai Shenhua in a 2-2 draw.

Wuhan Guangu

Unable to establish himself within the Shandong team he would transfer to Wuhan Guanggu at the beginning of the 2007 league season with fellow Shandong teammates Deng Xiaofei, Guo Mingyue and Li Zhuangfei. Taking time to establish himself within his new team Ren Yongshun eventually made his debut on August 26, 2007 against Shanghai Shenhua in a 0-0 draw. This was followed by several further league appearances, however the 2008 Chinese Super League season was to prove a difficult period for him as he quickly lost his place within the Wuhan team, this was added by Wuhan being ejected and subsequently relegated from the Chinese Super League after the club's management did not accept the punishment given to them by the Chinese Football Association after a scuffle broke out during a league game against Beijing Guoan on September 27, 2008.

Jiangsu Sainty 

Without a football club to play in during the 2008 league season Ren Yongshun transferred to  second tier football team Jiangsu Sainty and helped them fight for promotion to the Chinese Super League. Despite only playing half the season his first season would go on to be a success and he would make 12 league appearances as well as winning the division title with them. The following season saw his playing time drop when the club decided to bring in several players to help them stay within the top tier and this saw Ren spend much of the season on the substitute bench, only making a further 12 appearances in the whole season.

Return Shandong Luneng 

Ren would go on to be released by Jiangsu Sainty at the end of the season and he would transfer back to Shandong Luneng at the beginning of 2010 league season.

Honours
Jiangsu Sainty
China League One: 2008

References

External links 
Player stats at Sohu.com

1985 births
Living people
Chinese footballers
Footballers from Qingdao
Shandong Taishan F.C. players
Wuhan Guanggu players
Jiangsu F.C. players
Chinese Super League players
China League One players
Association football defenders